John, known as canon of the Lateran or deacon of the Lateran (fl. 12th century), was a medieval Roman deacon, canon and religious chronicler. John lived in the second half of the 12th century, and served as a deacon and canon of the Basilica of St. John Lateran. He compiled a work on this papal basilica, and dedicated it, in the preface, to Pope Alexander III (c. 1100/1105 – 1181), thereby indicating the date of its composition. It was obviously a secondary object of the author in composing this work to support the canons of the Lateran in their dispute for precedence with the canons of St. Peter's Basilica.

References

Mabillon, ed. Iter Italicum, II, 560-76; P.L., CXCIV, 1543–50

Clergy from Rome
12th-century Italian writers
12th-century Italian Roman Catholic priests
Deacons